Isocylindra is a genus of moths in the family Sesiidae.

Species
Isocylindra melitosoma Meyrick, 1930

References

Sesiidae